Moktar Ould Daddah (December 25, 1924 – October 14, 2003) was a Mauritanian politician who led the country after it gained its independence from France. Daddah served as the country's first Prime Minister from 1957 to 1961 and as its first President of Mauritania, a position he held from 1960 until he was deposed in a military coup d'etat in 1978.

He established a one-party state, with his Mauritanian People's Party being the sole legal political entity in the country, and followed a policy of "Islamic socialism" with many nationalizations of private businesses. In his memoirs, Daddah expressed concern that the issue of slavery in Mauritania could lead to armed conflict that would ultimately destroy the country.

In foreign affairs, he joined the Non-Aligned Movement and maintained strong links with Mao Zedong and the People's Republic of China, but he also accepted Western (especially French) foreign aid. During his presidency, Mauritania saw conflict with the Polisario Front in Western Sahara after working to broker a deal to divide the territory with Morocco.

Background
Ould Daddah was born to an important marabout family of the Ouled Birri tribe in Boutilimit, Mauritania, French West Africa. After attending elite Islamic academies, he worked for the French colonial administrators as a translator. As a law student in Paris, he graduated as the first Mauritanian to hold a university degree.  He was later admitted to the bar at Dakar, Senegal in 1955. Upon his return to Mauritania in the late 1950s, Daddah joined the centre-left Mauritanian Progressive Union, and was elected President of its Executive Council. In 1959, however, he established a new political party, the Mauritanian Regroupment Party. In the last pre-independence legislative elections held later that year, his party won every seat in the National Assembly, and he was appointed Prime Minister. 

He was known for his ability to establish a consensus among different political parties, as well as between the White Moors, Black Moors and Black Africans, Mauritania's three main ethnic groups. The balanced representation of different ethnic and political groups in his government won the confidence of the French authorities, who granted independence to Mauritania under his leadership in 1960. Daddah was named Acting President of the new republic, and was confirmed in office in the first post-independence election in August 1961.

President of Mauritania (1960-1978) 
As President, Daddah pursued policies that differed markedly from those he had professed prior to independence. In September 1961, he formed a "government of national unity" with the main opposition party, and in December, he arranged for the four largest parties to merge as the Mauritanian People's Party (PPM), which became the sole legal party. He formalized the one-party state in 1964 with a new Constitution, which set up an authoritarian presidential regime. Daddah justified this decision on the grounds that he considered Mauritania unready for western-style multi-party democracy. Under this one-party constitution, Daddah was reelected in uncontested elections in 1966, 1971 and 1976.

In 1971, Daddah served as President of the Organization of African Unity (OAU). At home, however, his policies were criticized. The economy remained strongly dependent on Chinese and French foreign aid. Moreover, drought in the Sahel, principally in the period between 1969 and 1974, and a decline in export revenues due to fall in international prices of iron, had lowered living standards considerably. In 1975, he presented a charter which called for Mauritania to become an "Islamic, nationalist, centralist, and socialist democracy."  This charter was initially popular, and the opposition, in general, welcomed it. 

On the 18th of July 1974, president Moktar Ould Daddah, who was on a state visit to Nigeria, paid a visit to Sultan Abubakar, a fellow Islamic scholar, and friend in the company of General Yakubu Gowon.

War in Western Sahara
What brought an end to Ould Daddah's regime was Mauritania's war in Western Sahara against the Polisario Front, an indigenous movement fighting against the Moroccan-Mauritanian attempt to jointly annex the territory, starting in 1975. Ould Daddah had claimed the territory as part of Greater Mauritania since 1957, three years before independence, but the idea had only limited support in the general population. The Mauritanian Moors are closely related to the Sahrawis, and virtually all northern tribes had members on both sides of the (former) frontier, many of whom sympathized with the Polisario's demands for independence. 

In addition to the government's support for guerrillas in northern Mauritania, several thousand Mauritanians left the country to join the Polisario in its Tindouf camps. Further dissatisfaction arose in the South, from where Black troops were sent to fight what they regarded as an essentially inter-Arab conflict, and one which could, if successful, entrench Ould Daddah's discriminatory rule even further by the addition of several thousand new Moorish citizens. But Ould Daddah additionally sought the territory in order to prevent it from falling into Moroccan hands, still wary of the officially defunct Moroccan territorial demands on Mauritania. 

Following the Madrid Accords with Spain, Mauritania annexed a southern portion of the territory, renaming it Tiris al-Gharbiya. However, the small and poorly trained Mauritanian army failed to stop the guerilla incursions, despite backing from the French Air Force. Polisario then turned to attacking the iron mines in Zouerate, at which point the country's economy started backsliding, and Daddah's public support tumbled. In 1976, the capital Nouakchott was attacked by the Polisario Front, and Daddah was forced to appoint a military officer to head the ministry of defence.

Downfall and later life
On 10 July 1978, Lt. Col. Mustafa Ould Salek ousted Daddah in a military coup, and installed a junta to rule the country in his place. His successors would surrender Mauritania's claims to Western Sahara and withdraw from the war the following year. After a period of imprisonment, Ould Daddah was allowed to go into exile in France in August 1979, where he organized an opposition group, the Alliance pour une Mauritanie Democratique (AMD) in 1980. Attempts to overthrow the regime from abroad were unsuccessful. Ould Daddah was allowed to return to Mauritania on 17 July 2001, but died soon after at a military hospital, following a long illness, in Paris, France on 14 October 2003. His body was subsequently flown back to Mauritania, where it is buried.

Honours

Foreign honours
 Empire of Iran : Commemorative Medal of the 2500th Anniversary of the founding of the Persian Empire (14 October 1971).

References

External links
Moktar Ould Daddah on Encyclopædia Britannica

1924 births
2003 deaths
People from Boutilimit
Leaders ousted by a coup
Mauritanian prisoners and detainees
Prisoners and detainees of Mauritania
Mauritanian exiles
Mauritanian People's Party politicians
Mauritanian Moors
Translators to French
Translators to Arabic
Flag designers
20th-century translators
Heads of government who were later imprisoned
Muslim socialists